Asad Shan is a British actor, fashion model, TV presenter and producer/director. He was formerly an investment banker, having worked for RBS (ABN AMRO) and HSBC. In 2004, he was crowned Mr. Asia UK. The film 7 Welcome to London was both his acting and directorial debut. It received critical and commercial acclaim after its UK release, and has gone on to become the most successful British made Hindi language film in the UK. Shan's other notable appearances include being a veejay for B4U Music, and he is currently on Zee TV's Zing as a host for the weekend film show Brits Bollywood, as well as the daily rude tube show Grinds My Teeth. Shan has starred in New York Film Academy and Lee Strasberg Theatre Institute productions of the well-renowned East is East and The Glass Menagerie. He has recently endorsed campaigns for major brands like Sky Digital, HSBC and most recently One for the Boys, a charity chaired by Samuel L. Jackson.

Early life 
Asad was born in London to parents of Kashmiri ancestry and raised in East London. His grandparents moved to London from Kashmir in the 1940s. He studied at Brentwood School in Essex. He then studied law and management at university. Asad grew up supporting Liverpool F.C. and is an avid tennis and football player.

Career 
Upon graduating with a degree in law and management, he worked as an investment banker in the city of London for two years in Corporate Broking and ECM. In 2004, Asad won the Mr. Asia UK competition. Inspired by this win, he went to New York to train in method acting at the Lee Strasberg Theatre Institute and in Film Performance at the New York Film Academy. he then moved from the Big Apple to Mumbai, India to begin work in Bollywood.

Within a few months after his move to Mumbai he was seen on the runways at Indian Fashion Week as well as being an ambassador for top fashion labels and eventually became one of the most sought-after veejays for B4U Music. In 2009 he was named the 'Best & Sexiest VJ' at the music channel. He fronted popular shows like "Just Request", "Star Stop", "Flash" and "India's Top Ten".

Eventually seeing an opportunity and growth in the UK market, Asad shifted base back to London from Bombay where he started a film production company Iconic Productions UK Limited. He worked on the company's debut venture, a Bollywood thriller film titled 7 Welcome to London. He played Jai in the starring role. The film was set in London and had a UK wide release on 9 March 2012.

In the 2016 film London Life he played the protagonist Raj. The English film is set in London and is about Indian students who migrate to the UK and the problems they face.

Since 2011, he is UK's most popular & recognised face on Zee TV's music channel Zing as a host for Brits Bollywood and UK's first Asian Rude Tube show " Grinds My Teeth" which has gathered a huge response in the UK Shan has hosted a daily request show Rock The Vibe in the past for Zing.

Asad also dabbled as a creative producer for the Black Arts company in Soho London, and has been the creator and host of "The Film Show" on Zing TV from 2015 to 2018, which is an Iconic production and commissioned by Zee TV.

Asad is currently filming his first drama serial called "Aabgeenay" written by Qaisra Hayat and directed by Nadeem Siddique.

Personal life 
Asad enjoys playing Sunday league football and Docklands tennis league in London. He played tennis at UK county level. He loves outdoor sports and is a keen hiker.

Filmography

Theatre productions

Television

Commercials

Modelling

See also 
 List of British actors

External links

References 

Living people
Year of birth missing (living people)
British male models
English male film actors
English male stage actors
English male models
English people of Pakistani descent
British film actors of Pakistani descent
Kashmiri people